The Nisutlin Plateau is a sub-plateau, of the Yukon Plateau physiographic section, in northern British Columbia, Canada, extending east from Teslin Lake to the Cassiar Mountains.

See also
Teslin Plateau

References

Nisutlin Plateau in the Canadian Mountain Encyclopedia

Plateaus of British Columbia
Stikine Ranges